Port of Pangkal Balam is a seaport in Pangkal Pinang, Bangka. It is the headquarters for port authorities across the island. The port sits close to the mouth of Baturusa River, it runs just north of the city.

The port serves both Indonesian inter-island and international cargo and passenger services, shipping 31,754 tonnes of tin for export in 2015.

While the port was designed for ships with capacities of up to 4,000 GTs, silting of the river mouth has reduced its capacity and efficiency, resulting in plans to move the island's primary port elsewhere.

References

Ports and harbours of Indonesia
Bangka Belitung Islands